Mária Kucserka (born 13 December 1951) is a Hungarian athlete. She competed in the women's javelin throw at the 1972 Summer Olympics.

References

External links
 

1951 births
Living people
Athletes (track and field) at the 1972 Summer Olympics
Hungarian female javelin throwers
Olympic athletes of Hungary
People from Balatonfüred
Sportspeople from Veszprém County